The National Library of Ireland (NLI) is the Republic of Ireland's national library located in Dublin, in a building designed by Thomas Newenham Deane. The mission of the National Library of Ireland is 'To collect, preserve, promote and make accessible the documentary and intellectual record of the life of Ireland and to contribute to the provision of access to the larger universe of recorded knowledge.'

The library is a reference library and, as such, does not lend. It has a large quantity of Irish and Irish-related material which can be consulted without charge; this includes books, maps, manuscripts, music, newspapers, periodicals and photographs. Included in its collections are materials issued by private as well as government publishers. Among the library's major holdings are an archive of Irish newspapers and collections donated by individual authors or their estates. The library is also the ISSN National Centre for Ireland. 

The office of the Chief Herald of Ireland, the National Photographic Archive and the Museum of Literature Ireland are functions of the library, the latter in partnership with University College Dublin. The library also holds exhibitions, and provides a number of other services including genealogy research tools and support. The Minister for Tourism, Culture, Arts, Gaeltacht, Sport and Media is the member of the Government of Ireland responsible for the library.

The main library building is on Kildare Street, adjacent to Leinster House and the archaeology section of the National Museum of Ireland.

History
The National Library of Ireland was established by the Dublin Science and Art Museum Act 1877, which provided that the bulk of the collections in the possession of the Royal Dublin Society, should be vested in the then Department of Science and Art for the benefit of the public and of the Society, and for the purposes of the Act.

An Agreement of 1881 provided that the Library should operate under the superintendence of a Council of twelve Trustees, eight of whom were appointed by the Society and four by the Government; this Agreement also conferred on the Trustees the duty of appointing the officers of the Library. This arrangement remained in place until the library became an autonomous cultural institution in 2005.

After the foundation of the Irish Free State in 1924/5 the Library was transferred to the Department of Education under which it remained until 1986 when it was transferred to the Department of the Taoiseach. In 1927 the Library was granted legal deposit status under the Industrial and Commercial Property (Protection) Act 1927. In 1992 the Library transferred to the newly established Department of Arts, Culture and the Gaeltacht (now Culture, Heritage and the Gaeltacht) and on 3 May 2005 became an autonomous cultural institution under the National Cultural Institutions Act 1997.

Governance
The library is governed by a board, with day-to-day management in the hands of a director and a number of heads of functions.  Directors of the library have included Thomas William Lyster (1895-1920), Robert Lloyd Praeger (1920-24), Richard Irvine Best (1924-40), Richard J. Hayes (1940-67) and Sandra Collins (2015-21). After a period under an acting director, in December 2022, the library announced that Audrey Whitty, deputy director of the National Museum of Ireland, would assume the office of director in early 2023.

Collections

Basis and legal deposit
The collection began with the transfer of books and papers from the Royal Dublin Society, and was significantly boosted by the addition of the library as a copyright library for Ireland from 1927 (by contrast, the library of Trinity College Dublin was already a copyright library for the UK and Ireland, a status it retains). The National Cultural Institutions Act 1997 mandated that the National Library of Ireland (NLI) collect all materials relating to Ireland to provide an accurate record of Irish output.

Major collections
The library holds over 12 million items.  The main collection is a combination of stock transferred from the Royal Dublin Society, including the Joly collection (25,000 volumes), later acquisitions, and copyright deposits of most printed, and some other, works published in Ireland since 1927.  The library purchases content from Northern Ireland, and attempts to collect all publications in Irish, and acquires a limited supply from further afield. The book collection numbers around 1 million volumes, principally sourced from the RDS legacy and legal deposit copies.  Other major collections include serials (recurrent publications other than newspapers, including magazines, journals and annual reports), maps and drawings, Government and other public sector publications, manuscripts, and original and microfilmed newspapers.  The NLI holds over 2,785 subject items related to 20th century Irish poets, and is a major source for poetry by Irish writers.

Personal archives and papers
The National Library of Ireland houses collections of archival papers, including personal notes and work books, of eminent writers including:
 Roddy Doyle
 Seamus Heaney
 Michael D. Higgins
 James Joyce
 Edna O'Brien
 Colm Tóibín
 Una Troy
 Sheila Wingfield
 W. B. Yeats

The National Library of Ireland houses the Sheehy Skeffington Papers, a collection of articles, books, poems, and other materials of Irish writers and activists, Francis Sheehy Skeffington, and Hanna Sheehy Skeffington.  These writings offer an understanding into the influence of the Francis and Hanna Skeffington in early 20th Century Irish culture and thought as well as insight into their family life.

The library also holds the Cooper Collection. Austin Cooper (1759–1831) was a County Tipperary clerk who produced numerous sketches of Irish antiquities which were preserved by his great grandson. The Cooper Collection also contains drawings by other artists including Francis Wheatley.

Parish registers
The Library also maintains an online index of all Catholic parish registers up to the 1880s which recorded baptisms, marriages and some burials. The original collection was preserved on microfilm and later was provided online.

Music
In 2010, the National Library of Ireland began a collaborative effort in a new website, the National Archive of Irish Composers, which was designed to develop a free online comprehensive collection of the sheet music of 18th and 19th century Irish composers. As of 2021, the website of the National Archive of Irish Composers describes the project as a collaborative venture between the National Library of Ireland, TU Dublin Conservatory of Music and Drama, Heritage Music Productions, directed by Dr Una Hunt.

Digital
In 2019, the Library accessioned its first "born digital" collection as a pilot scheme, receiving the digital collection of Irish author, Marian Keyes.

See also
 List of Ireland-related topics
 Thomas William Lyster, director of the library between 1895 and 1920.
 National Archives of Ireland
 National Photographic Archive
 Trinity College Library, Dublin
 UCD Library

References

External links

 
 National Library of Ireland Catalogue, including digitised material
 Sources: A National Library of Ireland database for Irish research
 National Library of Ireland on Facebook
 National Library of Ireland on Flickr
 National Library of Ireland on Twitter
 The National Library of Ireland's online exhibition, Yeats: The Life and Works of William Butler Yeats
 The National Library of Ireland's online exhibition, Discover your National Library
 The National Library of Ireland's online exhibition, The 1916 Rising: Personalities and Perspectives
 National Library of Ireland Collections on the European Library Portal

1877 establishments in Ireland
Ireland
Deposit libraries
Libraries in Dublin (city)
Archives in the Republic of Ireland
National museums of the Republic of Ireland
Museums in Dublin (city)
Libraries established in 1877
Department of Tourism, Culture, Arts, Gaeltacht, Sport and Media